Bailey Roy Akehurst (born 9 October 2003) is an English professional footballer who plays as a left back for  club Gillingham.

Career
Despite being a second-year scholar, Akehurst made his league debut for Gillingham in a 1-1 draw with Sheffield Wednesday on 13 September 2021, having made his first senior appearance in an EFL Trophy match against Crawley Town earlier in the season.

On 7 June 2022 he signed his first professional contract with the Kent side. Shortly into the 2022–23 season, he signed for Hastings United on loan.

Career statistics

References

Living people
English footballers
Association football defenders
Gillingham F.C. players
2003 births
English Football League players